Audiogram is an independent record label founded in Quebec in 1984. The label represents performers who have contributed to and have marked Quebec's cultural scene. In the 1990s, Audiogram became home to many of the top local French artists and in 1993 expanded into the English-speaking Canadian market with Montreal rock group Gogh Van Go. By 1997, Audiogram had a full slate of multicultural and multilingual releases. On 10 February 2021, Audiogram was acquired by conglomerate Quebecor, along with music publishing division Éditorial Avenue.

Roster

Alex Nevsky
Amylie
Anastasia Friedman
André Gagnon
Ariane Moffatt
Ariel
Béatrice Bonifassi
Belles-Soeurs
Bïa
Bran Van 3000
Carla Bruni
Damien Robitaille
Daniel Bélanger
GRUBB
Ian Kelly
Isabelle Boulay
Jean-Pierre Ferland
Jason Bajada
Jim Corcoran
Karkwa
Kevin Parent
Lhasa de Sela
Loco Locass
Loud Lary Ajust
Mara Tremblay
Marc Déry
Marc-André Gautier
Matt Holubowski
Paul Piché
Peter Peter
Philémon Cimon
Pierre Flynn
Pierre Lapointe
Pink Martini
Salomé Leclerc
Yves Desrosiers
Zébulon

Other names associated with Audiogram include: 
Adam Chaki
Alain Comeau
Alain Lefèvre
Alex Champigny
Beau Dommage
Carl Bastien
Chango Family
Clément Jacques
Cycle Pop
Fredric Gary Comeau
Freeworm
Gogh Van Go
Ily Morgane
Jean Leloup
JF Lemieux
Laurence Jalbert
Laurent Garnier
Llorca
Magneto
Magnolia
Marie-Jo Thério
Marie-Michèle Desrosiers
Michel Rivard
Monica Freire
Océane
Paul Ahmarani
Paul Kunigis (earlier known as Jesczse Raz)
Richard Séguin
Ringo Rinfret
Rock et Belles Oreilles
Sara Anastasia
Senaya
Steve Hill
The National Parcs
The Sound of Sea Animals
Tom Poisson
Urbain Desbois
Vilain Pingouin
Yves Duteil
Yves Marchand
Zachary Richard

See also
List of Quebec record labels
List of Quebec musicians
Music of Quebec
Culture of Quebec
List of record labels

References

External links
Official WayBack Machine Archived site (with audio excerpts)
Official site

 
Record labels established in 1980
Canadian independent record labels
Quebec record labels